Stevenson McGill (1765-1840) was a Scottish minister of the Church of Scotland who served as  Moderator of the General Assembly of the Church of Scotland in 1828. He was an author and was elected to be a professor of divinity at Glasgow University.

Early life and education

Stevenson was born in Port Glasgow on 19 January 1765 the son of Thomas Macgill, a shipbuilder on the River Clyde. His mother, Frances Welsh, daughter of George Welsh, esq., of Lochharet in East Lothian, may have been a descendant of the John Welch, son-in-law of John Knox. Macgill was educated in the parish school at Port Glasgow and Glasgow University, which he entered at the age of ten and took the nine years' course, gaining many distinctions in classics and theology.

Ministry and early writing
After acting as a private tutor to the Earl of Buchan, among others, he was licensed to preach by the Paisley presbytery in 1790, and in the following year was presented to the parish of Eastwood, Renfrewshire where he worked from 1791 to 1797. He also received an offer of the chair of civil history in the united colleges of St. Salvator and St. Leonard at St. Andrews, together with a small country living, but conscientious scruples prevented his accepting any plurality. In 1790 he contributed the ‘Student's Dream’ anonymously to ‘Macnab's Collection,’ and in 1792 published a tract against the French revolution called ‘The Spirit of the Times.’ In 1797 he was translated to the Tron Church, Glasgow, and the ‘dearth’ which occurred soon afterwards gave abundant scope for his parochial energies. On 23 August 1803 he received the degree of D.D. from the university and Marischal College, Aberdeen. He bestowed considerable attention on the prisons, infirmary, and lunatic asylum, and in 1809 published his ‘Thoughts on Prisons,’ advocating extensive reforms, which were not, however, adopted when the Glasgow prison was built. He insisted upon further church accommodation, urging that lack of it encouraged the growth of dissent, and started an association for mutual instruction in literature and theology, before which he read a series of essays, afterwards published as ‘Letters addressed to a Young Clergyman,’ 1809. A second edition, enlarged and dedicated to Hannah More, was issued in 1820.

University professor
In 1814 he was elected to the chair of theology in the university of Glasgow, vacated by the death of Dr. Robert Findlay; he demitted his charge of Tron Church on 9 November 1814, and was succeeded by Thomas Chalmers; and as professor reorganised the study of theology. In 1823 he engaged in a warm dispute with some of his university colleagues, notably Patrick MacFarlan, on the question of pluralities, and his views were subsequently adopted by a royal commission on the Scottish universities.

Death and legacy

In 1825 he began campaigning for a monument to John Knox on Fir Hill adjacent to Glasgow Cathedral. This met with success and is now the centrepiece of the Glasgow Necropolis which grew around it.

In 1828 he succeeded Very Rev Robert Haldane as Moderator of the General Assembly. He in turn was succeeded in 1829 by Patrick Forbes of Old Machar.

In 1834 he succeeded Very Rev John Inglis as dean of the Chapel Royal. He died on 18 August 1840 aged 75.

A memorial tablet to McGill lies in the undercroft section of the University of Glasgow.

Family

In April 1817 he married Margaret Crawford (d.1874), only daughter of Major Moris Crawford (sic) of Newfield HEICS. They had several children.

Publications

Statistical Account of the Parish of Eastwood  (1791)
The  Student's  Dream  [anonymously]  (Macnab's Collection,  1790)
The  Spirit  of  the  Times  (Glasgow,  1792)
Remarks  on Prisons  (Glasgow,  1809)
Considerations addressed  to  a  Young  Clergyman  (Glasgow, 1809,  2nd  ed.  [as  Letters  addressed],  1820)
On  Lunatic  Asylums  (Glasgow,  1810)
Discourse on  Elementary  Education  (Glasgow, 1811)
A  Collection  of  Sacred  Translations, Paraphrases,  and  Hymns  (Glasgow,  1813)
Discourses  and  Essays  on  Subjects  of  Public Interest  (Edinburgh,  1819)
On  the  Connection of  Situation  with  Character  (1820)
A  Sermon  preached  before  the  S.P.C.K. (Edinburgh,  1824)
A  Sermon  preached  in behalf  of  the  Church  Accommodation  Society (Glasgow,  1834)
Lectures  on  Rhetoric and  Criticism  (Edinburgh,  1838,  Glasgow, 1852)
Sermons  (portrait)  (Glasgow,  1839)
Discourses  [with  Memoir]  (Glasgow,  1844)
Evidences  of  Christianity  [Memoir  by  his brother  Francis]  (1852)

References

Citations

Sources

External links
 

1840 deaths
19th-century Ministers of the Church of Scotland
Alumni of the University of Glasgow
Academics of the University of Glasgow
Moderators of the General Assembly of the Church of Scotland
1765 births
18th-century Ministers of the Church of Scotland